Dapagliflozin/metformin, sold under the brand name Xigduo XR among others, is a fixed-dose combination anti-diabetic medication used as an adjunct to diet and exercise to improve glycemic control in adults with type 2 diabetes. It is a combination of dapagliflozin and metformin. Dapagliflozin/metformin was approved for use in the European Union in January 2014, and for use in the United States in February 2014. It is taken by mouth.

Adverse effects 
To lessen the risk of developing ketoacidosis (a serious condition in which the body produces high levels of blood acids called ketones) after surgery, the FDA has approved changes to the prescribing information for SGLT2 inhibitor diabetes medicines to recommend they be stopped temporarily before scheduled surgery. Canagliflozin, dapagliflozin, and empagliflozin should each be stopped at least three days before, and ertugliflozin should be stopped at least four days before scheduled surgery.

Symptoms of ketoacidosis include nausea, vomiting, abdominal pain, tiredness, and trouble breathing.

References

External links
 
 
 

Anti-diabetic drugs
AstraZeneca brands
Biguanides
Chloroarenes
Combination drugs
Glucosides
Guanidines
Phenol ethers
SGLT2 inhibitors